Bernardino Gaetano Scorza (29 September 1876, in Morano Calabro – 6 August 1939, in Rome) was an Italian mathematician working in algebraic geometry, whose work inspired the theory of Scorza varieties.

Publications

References

Italian mathematicians
People from the Province of Cosenza
1876 births
1939 deaths